Philomène Grandin (born 23 September 1974, in Stockholm) is a Swedish actress and television host. She is the daughter of Izzy Young, the folk music expert. She works at theatres and participates in TV series. She is married to the musician Lars Demian.
They have two children.

She studied at the Ecole Int. de theatre Jaques Lecoq, Paris 1992–94. Grandin has since performed in many Swedish films, television programmes and theatre productions. She hosted the children's television show Philofix in 2008.

Filmography
1995 - Jag heter Mitra
2000 – Vintergatan 5a (TV)
2001 – Anderssons älskarinna
2001 – Vintergatan 5b (TV)
2003 – Kvinnor emellan
2004 – Min f.d. familj
2008 – Om ett hjärta
2008 – Värsta vännerna (TV)
2010 – Vid Vintergatans slut (TV)
2010 - Trust Me

References

External links
Official website

1974 births
Actresses from Stockholm
Living people
Swedish film actresses
Swedish people of American descent
Swedish people of Polish-Jewish descent
Swedish stage actresses
Swedish television actresses
Swedish television personalities
Swedish women television presenters
Swedish people of French descent